The history of standard time in the United States began November 18, 1883, when United States and Canadian railroads instituted standard time in time zones. Before then, time of day was a local matter, and most cities and towns used some form of local solar time, maintained by some well-known clock (for example, on a church steeple or in a jeweler's window). The new standard time system was not immediately embraced by all.

Use of standard time gradually increased because of its obvious practical advantages for communication and travel. Standard time in time zones was not established in U.S. law until the Standard Time Act of 1918 of March 19, 1918, also known as the Calder Act (15 USC 260). The act also established daylight saving time, itself a contentious idea.

Daylight saving time was repealed in 1919, but standard time in time zones remained in law, with the Interstate Commerce Commission (ICC) having the authority over time zone boundaries. Daylight time became a local matter. It was re-established nationally early in World War II, and was continuously observed until the end of the war.

After the war its use varied among states and localities. The Uniform Time Act of 1966 provided standardization in the dates of beginning and end of daylight time in the U.S. but allowed for local exemptions from its observance. The act also continued the authority of the ICC over time zone boundaries. In subsequent years, the United States Congress transferred the authority over time zones to the U.S. Department of Transportation (DOT).

Time zone boundaries have changed greatly since their original introduction and changes still occasionally occur. DOT issues press releases when these changes are made. Generally, time zone boundaries have tended to shift westward. Places on the eastern edge of a time zone can effectively move sunset an hour later (by the clock) by shifting to the time zone immediately to their east.

If they do so, the boundary of that zone is locally shifted to the west; the accumulation of such changes results in the long-term westward trend. The process is not inexorable, however, since the late sunrises experienced by such places during the winter may be regarded as too undesirable. Furthermore, under the law, the principal standard for deciding on a time zone change is the "convenience of commerce". Proposed time zone changes have been both approved and rejected based on this criterion, although most such proposals have been accepted.

Development of Railway time in 1883

One of the first reported incidents which brought about a change in how time was organized on railways in the United States occurred in New England in August 1853. Two trains heading towards each other on the same track collided as the train guards had different times set on their watches, resulting in the death of 14 passengers. Railway schedules were coordinated in New England shortly after this incident Numerous other collisions led to the setting up of the General Time Convention, a committee of railway companies to agree on scheduling.

In 1870 Charles F. Dowd, who was unconnected with the railway movement or civil authorities, proposed A System of National Times for Railroads, which involved a single time for railways but the keeping of local times for towns. Although this did not find favor with railway managers, in 1881 they agreed for the idea to be investigated by William Frederick Allen, Secretary of the General Time Convention and Managing Editor of the Travellers' Official Guide to the Railways. He proposed replacing the 50 different railway times with five time zones. He eventually persuaded the railway managers and the politicians running the cities that had several railway stations that it was in their interests to speedily adopt his simpler proposals, which aligned the zones with cities' railroad stations. In doing so, they would pre-empt the imposition of more costly and cumbersome arrangements by different state legislators and the naval authorities, both of whom favored retention of local times.  On 11 October 1883, a convention of railroad executives met in Chicago at the General Time Convention (latter renamed the American Railway Association) and agreed to the implementation of five time zones in North America, using as a basis Greenwich Mean Time.

Right to the end there was opposition expressed by many smaller towns and cities to the imposition of railway time. For example, in Indianapolis the report in the daily Sentinel for 17 November 1883 protested that people would have to "eat sleep work ... and marry by railroad time". However, with the support of nearly all railway companies, most cities and influential observatories such as Yale and Harvard, this collaborative approach led to standard railway time being introduced at noon on 18 November 1883. This consensus held and was incorporated into federal law only in 1918.

War Time 1918 and 1942

Daylight saving time was established by the Standard Time Act of 1918. The Act was intended to save electricity for seven months of the year, during World War I. DST was repealed in 1919 over a Presidential veto, but standard time in time zones remained in law, with the Interstate Commerce Commission (ICC) having the authority over time zone boundaries. Daylight time became a local matter.
 
During World War II, Congress enacted the War Time Act (56 Stat. 9) on January 20, 1942.  Year-round DST was reinstated in the United States on February 9, 1942, again as a wartime measure to conserve energy resources. This remained in effect until after the end of the war.  After V-J Day, the word 'war' and the middle letter 'W' were changed to 'prevailing' and 'P', but the advance in the clock was not reverted.

The Amendment to the War Time Act (59 Stat. 537), enacted September 25, 1945, ended DST as of September 30, 1945.  During this period, the official designation War Time was used for year-round DST. For example, Eastern War Time (EWT) would be the equivalent of Eastern Daylight Time during this period.

Daylight Saving Time 1945 to 1966
From 1945 to 1966 U.S. federal law did not address DST. States and cities were free to observe DST or not, and most places that did observe DST did so from the last Sunday in April to the last Sunday in September. In the mid-1950s many areas in the northeastern United States began extending DST to the last Sunday in October. The lack of standardization led to a patchwork where some areas observed DST while adjacent areas did not, and it was not unheard of to have to reset a clock several times during a short trip (e.g., bus drivers operating on West Virginia Route 2 between Moundsville, West Virginia, and Steubenville, Ohio had to reset their watches seven times over 35 miles).

In summer 1960 April–October Daylight Time was nearly universal in Pennsylvania, Maryland, Delaware and states east and north of there. In Minnesota, Iowa, Missouri, Kentucky and Virginia and states north and east of there, some areas had it and some did not. Except for California and Nevada, which had April-Sept Daylight Time, 99% of the rest of the country used Standard Time year-round. (The Official Guide says "State law prohibits the observance of "Daylight Saving" time in Kentucky but Anchorage, Louisville and Shelbyville will advance their clocks one hour from Central Standard time for the period April 24 to October 29, inclusive.")

In the middle 1960s the airline and other transportation industries lobbied for uniformity of Daylight dates in the United States.

DST 1966
The U.S. federal Uniform Time Act became law on April 13, 1966, and it mandated that DST begin nationwide on the last Sunday in April and end on the last Sunday in October, effective in 1967. The act explicitly preempted all previously enacted state laws related to the beginning and ending of DST effective in 1966. Any state that wanted to be exempt from DST could do so by passing a state law, provided that it exempted the entire state, and Alaska, Arizona, Hawaii, Indiana, and Michigan chose to do so. However, Alaska, Indiana, and Michigan subsequently chose to observe DST. The law was amended in 1972 to permit states that straddle a time zone boundary to exempt the entire area of the state lying in one time zone.  Indiana chose to exempt the portion of the state lying in the Eastern Time Zone; however, that exemption was eliminated in 2006 and the entire state of Indiana now observes DST, leaving Arizona (with the exception of the Navajo Nation) and Hawaii as the only two states not to observe DST. On July 8, 1986, President Ronald Reagan signed the Federal Fire Prevention and Control Act of 1986 into law that contained a daylight saving rider authored by Senator Slade Gorton (R-WA). The starting date of DST was amended to the first Sunday in April effective in 1987. DST continued to end on the last Sunday in October. While the states retain the capability to exempt themselves from DST, they are forbidden by the 1966 federal law (15 USC 260a(b)) from increasing a state's time spent on DST, unless the United States Congress does this for the entire nation.

In response to the 1973 energy crisis, DST in the United States began earlier in both 1974 and 1975, commencing on the first Sunday in January (January 6) in the former year and the last Sunday in February (February 23) in the latter. The extension of daylight saving time was not continued due to public opposition to late sunrise times during the winter months. In 1976, the United States reverted to the schedule set in the Uniform Time Act.

DST 2007
Starting March 11, 2007, DST was extended another four to five weeks, from the second Sunday of March to the first Sunday of November. The change was introduced by Representatives Fred Upton (R-MI) and Edward Markey (D-MA) and added to the Energy Policy Act of 2005; the House had originally approved a motion that would have extended DST even farther from the first Sunday in March to the last Sunday in November, but Senators Jeff Bingaman (D-NM) and Pete Domenici (R-NM) agreed to scale back the proposal in conference committee due to complaints from farmers and the airline industry. Proponents claimed that the extension would save "the equivalent of"  of oil per day, but this figure was based on U.S. Department of Energy information from the 1970s, the accuracy and relevance of which the DoE no longer stands by.  Later studies by the U.S. Department of Energy and the California Energy Commission have predicted much smaller energy benefits. There is very little recent research on what the actual positive effects, if any, might be.

Since DST moves sunrise one hour later by the clock, late sunrise times become a problem when DST is observed either too far before the vernal equinox or too far after the autumnal equinox. Because of this, the extension was greeted with criticism by those concerned for the safety of children who would have been forced to travel to school before sunrise, especially in the month of March. In addition, the airline industry was especially concerned if DST were to be extended through to the last Sunday in November, as this is very often the Sunday after Thanksgiving (except for 2013, 2019, 2024, and 2030), as this is always the Sunday after the fourth Friday in November, and Thanksgiving is on the fourth Thursday in November.  This is one of the busiest travel days at American airports, and could have resulted in much havoc among travelers who forgot that the clocks were changing that day.

If the original proposal to extend DST through the last Sunday in November had been adopted, the entire United States, with the exception of the states that exempted themselves, would have experienced the latest sunrises of the year during the month of November, which would have approached the extremely late sunrise times when DST went into effect on January 6, 1974, due to the 1973 energy crisis creeping after 9 am in places like New Salem, North Dakota at the northwestern edges of time zones.

Start and end dates of United States Daylight Saving Time

See also
 Daylight saving time in the United States – gives a list of future daylight saving dates
 Permanent time observation in the United States
 Time in Indiana
 Time in the United States

Notes

References 
 Prerau, David. Seize the Daylight: The Curious and Contentious Story of Daylight Saving Time (Thunder's Mouth Press) Discusses the establishment of standard time and daylight saving time.

External links
U.S. Navy time zone page
Standard Time Zone Boundaries 49CFR71
U.S. Law 15USC260-267
History of Daylight Saving Time at WebExhibits
Recent Time Zone Proceedings (Dept. of Transportation)

Economic history of the United States
History of science and technology in the United States
Time in the United States
History of the United States by topic
History of measurement